Nanny 911 is a reality television show in the United States, which originally aired on Fox from 2004 to 2007.

On February 27, 2008, Fox announced that it sold the rights to Nanny 911 (as well as its partnered Fox show, Trading Spouses) to CMT. New episodes of the series aired on CMT from April to June 2009. The show also previously aired reruns on ABC Family in 2008.

In the United Kingdom, the show airs on ITV2, whose sister company, Granada America, produces the show.

Synopsis
Nanny 911 is loosely based on the British television programme Little Angels, in which American families with unmanageable children are reformed by British nannies, including one who served for the royal family.

The introduction features montages of several clips of unruly children (and the nannies' surprised reactions), whereupon stock footage shows a "call" being made to Nanny 911 where "Head Nanny Lilian" (Lilian Sperling, featured as "Nanny to the British Royal Family") answers "Nanny 911" (on an old rotary dial phone).

After the intro the selected family is featured on a separate clip. Head Nanny Lilian and the other nannies – "Nanny Deb" (Deborah Carroll), "Nanny Stella" (Stella Reid), and "Nanny Yvonne" (originally Yvonne Shove,  later replaced by Yvonne Finnerty for unspecified reasons) discuss the clip, whereupon Lilian announces (based on the major need; each nanny specializes in one area, such as proper etiquette or controlling temper tantrums) which nanny will visit the family. The nannies are featured visiting the family in traditional nanny dress (similar to that worn by Mary Poppins).

The nanny's first day is spent solely in observing the family dynamics in order to determine a suitable plan of action for changing the children's behavior; at the end of the day the nanny discusses what needs to be done. The remainder of the week shows the plan being implemented, along with the parents' reactions (which can be quite negative, especially when the nanny mentions how the parents' actions have resulted in the problem). At the end of the week, the nanny generally compliments the family for the changed behavior. The last segment shows the family receiving a substantial gift from the nanny (such as a new car or a home renovation).

The families that are eligible for the show usually have four or more children (though some episodes show homes with fewer children), and the children are usually younger than 9 years of age (though also not always the case). The parents usually have an income that allows them to be upper middle-class.

After Season Two, the gift portion was removed. In Season Four, Nanny Yvonne did not appear due to budgetary reasons and the format changed. Rather than showing a clip to the nannies then deciding which one would go, Lillian just called one of them and sent them to the family. In some episodes this season, the nanny observes for two days rather than one.

International versions+
Nanny 911 has been broadcast or slightly adapted in other countries.

 The American version of Nanny 911 has been shown on ITV2 and the main ITV Network.
 Reruns of the U.S. version of Nanny 911 are shown on Dabl.  They were previously on CMT and Up TV.
 The U.S. version is shown in Canada on W Network and Twist TV.
 The Chinese version is shown on Guizhou Satellite Channel and known as 育儿大师.
 The U.S. version is shown in Mexico on TVNL and known as Niñera S.O.S.
 Katharina Saalfrank is the Nanny 911 in the German version, aired on RTL.
 Dorota Zawadzka is the Nanny 911 in the Polish version, aired on TVN, and a co-host of the talk-show I Ty możesz mieć superdziecko (You too can have a superchild), in which Nanny 911 analyzes episodes from her series, talks to celebrity parents, and gives her advice. It is broadcast by TVN Style.
 Cathy Sarrai was the Nanny 911 in the French version, aired by M6, until her death from lung cancer on January 19, 2010. The new Nanny is Sylvie  since November 2013.
 Rocio Ramos is the Nanny 911 in the Spanish version, broadcast on Cuatro. Another version with teenagers called S.O.S. Adolescentes is also aired on Cuatro. In the Spanish regions of Catalonia and Basque Country, the original version is broadcast by TV3 with Catalan dubbing and by ETB 1 with Basque dubbing respectively.
 The Dutch version is called Eerste Hulp Bij Opvoeden. The name is a play on Eerste Hulp Bij Ongevallen, the Dutch term for first aid. Other similar programmes exist, such as Schatjes, which use a slightly different concept.
 The Italian version is called S.O.S. Tata and aired until 2012 on Fox Life and La7, and since 2021 on discovery+.
 The Singaporean version aired on MediaCorp TV12 okto.
 The Malaysian version aired on NTV7.
 The Indonesian version aired on MetroTV.
 The first Romanian nanny was Irina Petrea. The second was Raluca Iuga. The show aired on Prima TV.
 The Israeli Nanny 911 is Michal Daliot. Aired on Channel 2, the show is also called Supernanny.
 The Greek version is aired on Skai TV, with the name Νταντά Πρώτων Βοηθειών (First-aid nanny).
 There is a Swedish version also called Nanny 911, where there was three nannies instead of one. It was aired a few years ago on TV4.
 Wendy Bosmans is the Nanny 911 in the Belgian version aired on vtm.
 A French Canadian version of Nanny 911 also exists, called Dre. Nadia : Psychologue à domicile ("Dr. Nadia : Psychologist at home").
 The Russian version of Nanny 911 is aired by TNT, with the name "Няня спешит на помощь" ("Nanny races to rescue").

See also
Supernanny

References

External links
 

2000s American reality television series
2004 American television series debuts
2009 American television series endings
Fox Broadcasting Company original programming
CMT (American TV channel) original programming
Television series by 20th Century Fox Television
Television series by CBS Studios
Television series by ITV Studios
English-language television shows
Works about child care occupations

de:Die Super Nanny
es:Supernanny
fr:Supernanny
ms:Supernanny
pl:Superniania
pt:Supernanny
simple:Supernanny